Colonel Ildefonso Puigdendolas Ponce de Leon (1876, in Girona – 31 October 1936, near Illescas) was a Spanish military officer who served the Republic during the Spanish Civil War. In 1931 he was colonel of Infantry in Seville as inspector of the security corps. In 1934 he was appointed to Malaga. In July 1936 he defeated the rebels forces at Alcala de Henares and Guadalajara. After that, he commanded the Loyalist militia at the Battle of Badajoz in 1936. After the battle of Badajoz he escaped to Portugal and returned to the zone controlled by the Spanish Republican Army. During the battle of Seseña Puigdendolas was killed by his own men when trying to prevent desertion.

Notes

References 

 Espinosa, Francisco. La columna de la muerte. El avance del ejército franquista de Sevilla a Badajoz. Editorial Crítica. 2003. Barcelona.
 Espinosa, Francisco. La justicia de Queipo. Editorial Crítica. Barcelona. 2006. 
Thomas, Hugh. (2001). The Spanish Civil War. Penguin Books. London.

1876 births
1936 deaths
People from Girona
Spanish colonels
Unión Militar Republicana Antifascista members
Spanish military personnel of the Spanish Civil War (Republican faction)
Spanish casualties of the Spanish Civil War
Military personnel killed in the Spanish Civil War